"Wake Up Boo!" is a song recorded by British indie band the Boo Radleys for their fourth album, Wake Up! (1995). It was by far their biggest hit both in the UK and internationally. The track is an upbeat guitar-pop song about the change from summer to autumn, contrasting the narrator's optimism ("Wake up, it's a beautiful morning") with his companion's pessimism ("You have to put the death in everything"). Part of the song was used as a jingle by Chris Evans for his BBC Radio 1 breakfast show in the mid nineties.

Composition and recording
According to Martin Carr, he spent a year working on the song's music. He described the lyrics of the song as being "about staying up all night". In a 2021 interview, Sice said that "Wake Up Boo!" was "about grabbing the last of summer while you can", and described it as a reflection of Carr's personality: "He can be very up and ebullient – 'Wake up, it’s a beautiful morning' – and then he can have that drop: 'You have to put the death in everything'". The band first recorded the song at Real World Studios in a heavier, more downbeat arrangement, which Tim Brown described as "a bit underwhelming". After pressure from Creation Records, they re-recorded it at Rockfield Studios, where they were inspired to use a Motown beat after listening to a Style Council b-side. They also recruited Tom Jones' brass section to play on the track.

Versions
On the album version of the song, the "Wake up, it's a beautiful morning" refrain is performed as an a cappella round as a prelude to the main track; this is absent from the single edit, which is otherwise identical.  The second CD single and 12" feature a version called "Wake Up Boo!: Music for Astronauts" which has three distinct segued sections: the standard radio edit in full, followed by a version of the a cappella round, and finally a mostly instrumental electronic dance track reprising musical elements of the main song. It was this "Music for Astronauts" version which later featured on the group's self-selected "best of" compilation, Find the Way Out, along with the B-side, "Blues for George Michael". The basic single version has never appeared on a Boo Radleys album (their other greatest hits collection Best of The Boo Radleys contains the album version) though it has appeared on many various artist collections.

Critical reception
In his weekly UK chart commentary, James Masterton said, "All of a sudden the bunch of Liverpudlians have turned on the magic and released what has to be the best single of the year so far, and then some. Quite simply it is the perfect piece of exuberent pop, an exquisite pastiche of the Liverpool beat bands that inspired a whole generation before them, complete with Beatlesque harmonies and a melody that could have been lifted from every Monkees record ever made." Pan-European magazine Music & Media wrote, "If you're young in the UK you either make dance or '60s-inspired pop. In the latter category the uncrowned champions the Boo Radleys deserve an equal share of the media attention as Oasis." A reviewer from Music Week gave it five out of five, naming it Single of the Week. The reviewer also described it as "a Wham!-style upbeat, summer song", adding that "it's a song to make you smile". Jonathan Bernstein from Spin felt that on the "horn-drenched" "Wake Up Boo!", "they're capable of forging a foot-stomper as exuberant" as Haircut 100's "Fantastic Day".

Music video
The promotional music video for "Wake Up Boo!" was filmed at Battersea Power Station.

Track listings
CD One

CD Two

12-inch

Credits and personnel
 Martin Carr – writing, backing vocals, guitar, keyboards,
 Sice – lead vocals
 Tim Brown – bass, piano, keyboards
 Rob Cieka – drums
 The Boo Radleys – production
 Andy Wilkinson – engineering
 Stephen A. Wood – cover art

Charts

Weekly charts

Year-end charts

Certifications

References

1995 singles
1995 songs
The Boo Radleys songs
Creation Records singles